Dhruva Space Private Limited is an Indian private aerospace manufacturer headquartered in Hyderabad, India. Founded in 2012 by Sanjay Srikanth Nekkanti, the company is engaged in the development of small satellites in the commercial, governmental and academic markets. It provides full-stack space-engineering solutions across launch, space and ground segments – namely, the building, launching and operation of satellites.

The founding team is composed of business and technology leaders who were formerly working with Exseed Space (now called Satellize), ams AG, Cisco and KPMG and all of whom are alumni of institutes such as BITS Pilani, SRM Institute of Science and Technology, EMLYON Business School, Luleå University of Technology and Arizona State University.

History 
In 2014, Dhruva Space signed a deal with AMSAT India to develop HAMSAT-II.

In December 2019, Dhruva Space raised ₹5 crore in funding led by Mumbai Angels Network.

In September 2020, Dhruva Space became the first Indian private company to secure an order for end-to-end design and development of space-grade solar arrays for satellites.

In October 2021, Dhruva Space raised ₹22 crore in funding led by Indian Angel Network (IAN) Fund and Blue Ashva Capital.

On 16 March 2022, Dhruva Space signed a commercial launch services agreement (LSA) with NewSpace India Limited for an in-orbit test of its Dhruva Space Orbit Deployers. These are likely to be used on board the PSLV and the SSLV.

On 10 June 2022 at the inauguration of Indian National Space Promotion and Authorization Centre (IN-SPACe) in Ahmedabad, Gujarat, Dhruva Space signed an MoU with IN-SPACe for the enablement of space activities, namely the testing and launch of satellites and satellite components. The MoU also dives into two more aspects of this integral partnership: the testing of the startup's own satellite deployers on the PSLV C53 Mission in June 2022, and the launch of its own two CubeSats – Thybolt-1 and Thybolt-2 – as a part of the PSLV C54 mission in November 2022.

On 24 June, Dhruva Space and Digantara Aerospace were announced as the first two private companies to receive authorisation from IN-SPACe for space activities.

Partnerships 
On 20 November 2020, Dhruva Space entered into an MoU with Skyroot Aerospace, a private Indian launch vehicle provider.

In May 2020, Dhruva Space entered into an MoU with Florida-based Sidus Space, to collaborate and catalyse the design, development, and commercialisation of new innovative space technologies and services.

On 16 February 2023, Dhruva Space signed a Memorandum of Agreement with French strategic equipment supplier Comat, for a bilateral technology exchange for diversity in market access and Space solutions.

On 16 March 2023, Dhruva Space announced a partnership with France-based satellite operator and global connectivity provider Kinéis. Both companies will collaborate to establish space and ground infrastructure to scale the diversity and impact of satellite-based solutions.

Awards & Accolades 
In October 2020, Dhruva Space was recognised with a National Startup Award by the Government of India for its efforts in Satellite and Space Technology.

In March 2022, Dhruva Space was named 'Best Spacetech Startup' by Entrepreneur India magazine, BusinessEx.com and Gupshup for the Startup 2022 Awards.

On March 17, 2022, Dhruva Space won the Qualcomm Design for India Challenge 2021 for their Bolt module, a switchable connectivity device that enables uninterrupted connection through cellular (5G) bands and satellite communication. The win includes a ₹65 lakh prize as well as patent-filing incentives, accelerator services, Government interactions, participation at industry events, dedicated engineering support and access to the Qualcomm Innovation Lab. In October 2022, the company exhibited Bolt at the India Mobile Congress 2022 at Pragati Maidan, New Delhi, as part of Qualcomm India's 5G Startups Showcase.

In April 2022, Dhruva Space's founders were featured in Fortune India magazine's 40 Under 40 annual list.

On 11 October 2022, Dhruva Space was named ‘Best Startup - Silver’ for the Telangana State Industry Awards 2022. The Award will be accoladed to the startup on 7 March 2023 by Kalvakuntla Taraka Rama Rao, Minister for Municipal Administration & Urban Development, Industries & Commerce, and Information Technology, Government of Telangana.

On 1 March 2023, Dhruva Space was awarded with an Innovation for India Award by the Marico Innovation Foundation. The Innovation for India Awards was held at Jio World Centre, Mumbai, and the award was accoladed to Dhruva Space by Rajeev Bakshi, Non-Executive & Independent Director, Marico Limited.

Missions 

On 30 June, Dhruva Space's Satellite Orbital Deployer was successfully tested and space-qualified (known as DSOD-1U Mission) in Indian Space Research Organisation's PSLV C53 mission. The launch took place at 18:02 IST from the Satish Dhawan Space Centre (SDSC) at Sriharikota, Andhra Pradesh.

Recognition of the mission success came from dignitaries including Prime Minister of India Narendra Modi, Minister of Commerce and Industry Piyush Goyal, Minister for Municipal Administration & Urban Development, Industries & Commerce, and IT Kalvakuntla Taraka Rama Rao.

On 26 November, Dhruva Space launched two amateur radio communication CubeSats as part of ISRO's PSLV C54 mission. The launch of Dhruva Space's Thybolt Mission took place at 11:56am from the Satish Dhawan Space Centre (SDSC) at Sriharikota, Andhra Pradesh. As of 1 February 2023, Thybolt-1 and Thybolt-2 completed 1000 orbits in LEO. The mission lifetime, according to the company, is approximately one year. At Broadband India Forum’s India SatCom 2022 in New Delhi, India, Dhruva Space was accoladed by IN-SPACe Chairman Dr. Pawan K Goenka to have 'the first private Indian satellites authorised by IN-SPACe, successfully deployed in orbit.'

The mission observed support from dignitaries including Prime Minister of India Narendra Modi, Minister for Road Transport & Highways Nitin Gadkari, Minister of Tourism, Culture and Development of North Eastern Region of India G Kishan Reddy, and Minister for Municipal Administration & Urban Development, Industries & Commerce, and IT Kalvakuntla Taraka Rama Rao.

References

External links

Space programme of India
Aerospace companies of India
Indian private spaceflight companies
Indian companies established in 2012
2012 establishments in Andhra Pradesh
Companies based in Hyderabad, India